Mantis the spider robot is a large, robotic spider created by Matt Denton and his company Micromagic Systems. It took four years to create and design it. The robot is capable to transport one person and can circulate on any surface. Several sensors around it help it to walk. The robot is controlled by a computer running the Linux operating system and HexEngine software, which controls the hydraulic solenoid in the legs.

References 

Robotic spiders
2013 robots
Robots of the United Kingdom